The Fort Sheridan Water Tower is a water tower in Fort Sheridan, Illinois.

History
The water tower was the main landmark of the Fort Sheridan military base, where it was part of a barracks complex. The base was commissioned in 1887 and was used by the United States Army until 1993. Built from 1889 to 1891, the tower was among the first structures completed in the fort. It was built with bricks made from Lake Bluff clay and designed to resemble St. Mark's Campanile in Venice. The bricks were creamy yellow and the roof was red terra cotta. A road which was once part of Sheridan Road passes through an arch at the bottom of the tower. Today, the arch only allows foot traffic. The tower held a  steel tank for water storage. The tank could be accessed by a 225-step spiral staircase.

The water was part of the complex used in the aftermath of World War I as U.S.A. General Hospital No. 28, later known as Lovell General Hospital. The hospital was only in use from 1918 to 1920. In 1949, the tower was lowered  to combat a structural weakness. This brought the Fort Sheridan Water Tower to its current height, . The tower's prominence has led to its use as a navigational landmark in the area.

The tower was recognized by the National Park Service with a listing on the National Register of Historic Places on December 4, 1974 under the name Water Tower, Building 49. On September 29, 1980, the building was listed as a contributing property to the Fort Sheridan Historic District, a National Historic Landmark District.

References

External links

Towers completed in 1891
National Register of Historic Places in Lake County, Illinois
Buildings and structures in Lake County, Illinois
Water towers in Illinois
Water towers on the National Register of Historic Places in Illinois